Karate at the 2007 Southeast Asian Games was held in the Kepkanchana Hall, Chanapolkhan Institute of Technology, Nakhon Ratchasima, Thailand.

Medal tally

Medalists

Kata

Kumite

Men

Women

External links
Southeast Asian Games Official Results
 

2007 Southeast Asian Games events
Southeast Asian Games
2007